Zeledón or Zeledon may refer to:

People
José Castulo Zeledón (1846–1923), Costa Rican ornithologist
José Joaquín Rodríguez Zeledón, President of Costa Rica from 1890 to 1894
José María Zeledón Brenes (1877–1949), Costa Rican politician, poet, journalist and writer
Manuel González Zeledón (1864–1936), Costa Rican writer
Rodrigo Alberto Carazo Zeledón (born 1948), Costa Rican politician, economist and lawyer
Vicente Herrera Zeledón (1821–1888), President of Costa Rica from 1876 to 1877
Benjamín Zeledón (1879–1912), Nicaraguan politician

Other uses
Estadio Municipal Pérez Zeledón, multi-use stadium in San Isidro, Costa Rica
Municipal Pérez Zeledón, Costa Rican football team
Pérez Zeledón (canton), the 19th canton in the province of San José in Costa Rica
Perez Zeledon Airport (IATA: N/A, ICAO: MRSI), an airport in Costa Rica

See also
Celedón (surname)